Jacques Rodocanachi (14 April 1882 – 7 November 1925) was a French fencer. He competed in the individual épée event at the 1908 Summer Olympics. A French Army officer, he was also a pistol shooter. He was injured during World War I and left the Army after the war, to become a steel engraver.

References

External links
 

1882 births
1925 deaths
French male épée fencers
Olympic fencers of France
Fencers at the 1908 Summer Olympics
French military personnel of World War I